Icebound is a novel written by Dean Koontz. The book was originally published in 1976 under the title Prison of Ice under Koontz's pseudonym David Axton, and was revised and re-released as Icebound in 1995.

Plot summary
The plot concerns a group of international scientists working for the project of towing an iceberg to be used as relief for droughts.  It is headed up by the husband and wife team of Rita and Harold (Harry) Carpenter. Rita secretly suffers from the fear of cold, ice and snow.  Due to an unexpected storm, the scientists become stranded on the iceberg with bombs ticking under them.  If they do not find a way out, they will perish.  A Russian submarine is trying to rescue them, but the rescue is complicated by the ice.  Meanwhile, another problem arises.  One of the crew members is secretly an assassin with an agenda of his own.

Critical reception

External links
Icebound book review

American thriller novels
1995 American novels
Novels by Dean Koontz
Novels set in the Arctic
Works published under a pseudonym
Ballantine Books books
Psychological thriller novels